Atty. Felixberto "Berting" Salang Urbiztondo is a Filipino politician. He served as the mayor of Barobo Surigao del Sur, Mindanao Philippines for 3 terms. Passing away while still in office on March 31, 2018.  A member of the Liberal Party, he is the son of the first mayor of Barobo. The late Honorable Felix P. Urbiztondo (Term 1961 - 1967). In the 2010 Philippine general election. Atty. Urbiztondo won convincingly against 3 other Mayoral candidates Allan Bernal, Matias Caybot and Mary Grace Sanchez.
During the 2013 Philippine general election. Mayor Urbiztondo won re-election with a landslide victory over opponent Allan Bernal. During the Philippine General Election, 2016 Mayor Urbiztondo won a 3rd term versus Arturo Ronquillo with another landslide victory. Winning all 22 Barangays and over 7000 votes of 22000 registered voters.

Early life
Born in September 24, 1941 in the Barangay of Tambis, Barobo, Surigao del Sur. He was the youngest of 3 children, the only son of Mayor Felix P. Urbiztondo and Baldomera Salang. He went on to study at University of the East. He became a lawyer in 1974. He practiced law under his father-in-law, Nicodemus Dasig's private law firm, Metro Manila until 1981.

Political life

Personal life
He married Josefina Dasig on January 12, 1969. They have three children: Felix D. 1969, Shaela 1971, and Nico 1972. They have eight grandchildren. 1 Great Grandchild.

References

http://noonbreakbalita.com/fishport-opening-and-inspection-in-barobo-surigao-del-sur/

http://www.mindanaodailynews.com/dar-hands-p49-6m-arisp-iii-project-in-surigao-sur-town/

http://philippinelaw.info/filipino-lawyers-directory/felixberto-s-urbiztondo

http://lmp.org.ph/default/index.php?option=com_content&view=article&id=20:caraga&catid=13:members&Itemid=4

http://www.caraga.dswd.gov.ph/index.php?option=com_content&view=article&id=307%3Asimultaneous-pantawid-pamilya-cash-card-distribution-conducted-in-bayugan-and-barobo&catid=58%3Aarticles&Itemid=60

http://www.philstar.com/Article.aspx?articleId=794684

Living people
1941 births
Liberal Party (Philippines) politicians
Mayors of places in Surigao del Sur
People from Surigao del Sur
University of the East alumni